John Johnson (1839–??) was a United States Navy sailor and a recipient of America's highest military decoration, the Medal of Honor.

Biography
On April 12, 1872, Davis was serving as a seaman on the steamship  near Greytown, Nicaragua, when an accident occurred. For his actions on that day, Seaman Johnson was awarded the Medal of Honor three months later, on July 9, 1872.

Medal of Honor citation
His official Medal of Honor citation reads:

Johnson displayed great coolness and self-possession at the time Comdr. A. F. Crosman and others were drowned and, by extraordinary heroism and personal exertion, prevented greater loss of life.

See also

List of Medal of Honor recipients during Peacetime
List of African American Medal of Honor recipients

References

1839 births
Year of death missing
United States Navy Medal of Honor recipients
United States Navy sailors
Military personnel from Philadelphia
Non-combat recipients of the Medal of Honor